Central Texas College (CTC) is a community college in Killeen, Texas. Founded in 1965, it has branch campuses in Europe and on military installations across the U.S.

History

Central Texas College was established by a vote of the citizens of Central Texas in 1965 to serve the western section of Bell County, Texas and Coryell County.  The campus was constructed on more than 500 acres of land donated by Fort Hood between Killeen and Copperas Cove.  In September 1967, the school opened its doors to 2,068 students.  CTC has been accredited by the Southern Association of Colleges and Schools since 1969.

As defined by the Texas Legislature, the official service area of CTC comprises:

 All of Coryell, Hamilton, Lampasas, Llano, Mason, Mills, and San Saba Counties
 Killeen Independent School District, located in Bell County
 Copperas Cove Independent School District, located in Bell and Coryell Counties
 Fort Hood and North Fort Hood in Bell County
 Brady, Lohn, and Rochelle school districts located within McCulloch County
 Burnet Consolidated Independent School District located within Burnet County
 Florence and Marble Falls school districts
 The portion of the Lampasas Independent School District located within Burnet and Bell Counties
 Fredericksburg ISD and Gillespie County, added effective September 1, 2015 after legislative approval.

Due to its proximity to the US Army installation at Fort Hood, Central Texas College has a large number of military-affiliated students. CTC instituted classes and programs on Fort Hood in 1970 and in Europe in 1974. Success with the military led to branch campuses at military installations such as Fort Leonard Wood in Missouri, South Korea, and on-ship with the Atlantic and Pacific Fleets of the US Navy in 1976. By the early 1980s, CTC offered classes to military personnel in the Pacific Command, Alaska, and Panama. CTC offered classes for the Texas Department of Criminal Justice in the prisons at Gatesville, Texas, in 1976.

In addition to its Texas locations, CTC still has a presence on more than 20 US military installations, in Europe and deployed locations offers more than 100 programs fully online. www.ctcd.edu/locations

Central Texas College had a nationally ranked tennis team in the early 1970s, playing as the Golden Eagles.  In 2013, a campus-wide vote led to the selection of CTC's new official mascot, the Eagle.

Degrees offered
Students enrolled at CTC may select a degree plan from Associate of Arts degree programs, Associate of Science degree programs, Associate in Applied Science degree programs, or Associate of Arts in General Studies. There are more than 40 certificate programs.

Main campus
At the main campus in Killeen, the central courtyard has a memorial statue to Lyndon Baines Johnson, and a fountain by which are metal markers indicating the boundary between Bell and Coryell counties.  CTC's main library is named in honor of Oveta Culp Hobby. CTC's older buildings are built in Spanish Colonial Revival Style.

CTC is also home to the beautiful music station KNCT-FM.

References

External links
 Central Texas College Home Page
 

Education in Bell County, Texas
Universities and colleges accredited by the Southern Association of Colleges and Schools
Community colleges in Texas
Educational institutions established in 1965
Buildings and structures in Bell County, Texas
1965 establishments in Texas